The Weiss is a river in the Haut-Rhin department, northeastern France. It flows through Orbey and Kaysersberg.

References

Rivers of France
Rivers of Grand Est
Rivers of Haut-Rhin